Milan Dević (Serbian Cyrillic: Милан Девић; born 30 May 1974) is former Serbian football goalkeeper. He last played for Serbian SuperLiga club FK Inđija. His current employment is at position of goalkeeping coach at Port F.C.

External links
 FK Inđija squad info at club's official website

1974 births
Living people
Serbian footballers
Association football goalkeepers
FK ČSK Čelarevo players
FK Inđija players
Serbian SuperLiga players
Serbian expatriate sportspeople in Thailand
People from Inđija